Thestor dicksoni, the Dickson's skolly, is a butterfly of the family Lycaenidae. It is found in South Africa.

The wingspan is 34-37.5 mm for males and 43–45 mm for females. Adults are on wing from December to April. There is one generation per year.

Subspecies
Thestor dicksoni dicksoni (montane fynbos in the Dasklip Pass near Porterville to the Roodezandsberg near the Tulbagh Kloof)
Thestor dicksoni malagas Dickson & Wykeham, 1994 (along the Atlantic coast and on the Langebaan peninsula)
Thestor dicksoni warreni Ball, 1994 (arid strandveld Karoo near Graafwater, between Clanwilliam and Lambertsbaai)

References

Butterflies described in 1954
Thestor
Endemic butterflies of South Africa